The following lists events that will happen in 2008 in Libya.

Incumbents
President: Muammar al-Gaddafi
Prime Minister: Baghdadi Mahmudi

 
Years of the 21st century in Libya
Libya
Libya
2000s in Libya